Hugh Stanley Philpott OBE (born 24 January 1961) is a retired British diplomat who served as Ambassador to Turkmenistan.

Education
He was educated at Brockenhurst College and the Open University.

Career 
Hugh Stanley Philpott began his career at the Foreign and Commonwealth Office in 1980, where he dealt with a wide range of issues, including international security, foreign countries and the Middle East. He previously served in cities such as Oslo, Budapest, Baghdad, Washington and Muscat. He also worked at the UK Department for International Development, responsible for technical support to Russia, as well as the UK Department of Enterprise, Innovation and Crafts, where he led the British science and innovation network.

Since 2015, as ambassador, he headed the British diplomatic mission in Dushanbe, Tajikistan.

In November 2018, he was appointed British Ambassador to Turkmenistan. September 26, 2019 presented credentials in Turkmenistan. He served as Ambassador to Turkmenistan until October 2021.

In 2020, he released a video on YouTube singing Turkmen song Turkmen Sahrasy.

In October 2021 Hugh Philpott was retired from the Diplomatic Service.

Personal life 
Hugh Stanley Philpott is married to Janine Frederica Philpott.

References

External links
Hugh Philpott, gov.uk
 

1961 births
Living people
Alumni of the Open University
Ambassadors of the United Kingdom to Tajikistan
Ambassadors of the United Kingdom to Turkmenistan
Officers of the Order of the British Empire
British diplomats